Megaloprepemyia excellens is a species of ulidiid or picture-winged fly in the genus Megaloprepemyia of the family Ulidiidae.

References

Ulidiidae